Alta is a town in Alta Municipality in Troms og Finnmark county, Norway.  The town is the administrative centre of the municipality and the major commercial centre in the western part of the county.  The town is located on the southern end of Altafjorden at the mouth of the river Altaelva.  There are several suburbs around the town.  Kåfjord, Kvenvik, and Jiepmaluokta lie to the west; Øvre Alta and Tverrelvdalen lie to the south; and Rafsbotn lies to the east.  The famous rock carvings at Alta lie just to the west of the town.

The town of Alta has three churches:  the historic Alta Church in Bossekop, the relatively new Elvebakken Church in Elvebakken, and the Northern Lights Cathedral (the new "main" church for the municipality that was completed in 2013).  Alta is also an educational centre in Finnmark county.  Finnmark University College is based in Alta as well as the local primary and secondary schools, including Alta Upper Secondary School.  Alta District Court is based in the town, serving the municipalities of Loppa and Alta.  Alta IF is the main sports team for the town.

Population
Alta is considered the northernmost city in the world with a population surpassing 10,000. The town of Alta was established in 2000 when the villages of Bossekop, Elvebakken, and Alta were joined and declared a town by the municipality council.

Transportation
Alta is a centre of transportation in Finnmark county.  The town has port facilities along Altafjorden, just alongside Alta Airport in Elvebakken.  The airport has direct flights to Oslo and certain other big cities in Norway like Tromsø.  The European route E6 highway also runs through the town and the European route E45 has its northern terminus in the town.  The main industries present in Alta include a concrete product factory; several wood mills and sawmills; and dairy, horticulture trade, and maritime services.

Media gallery

See also
List of towns and cities in Norway

References

Cities and towns in Norway
Alta, Norway
Populated places of Arctic Norway
2000 establishments in Norway
Populated places established in 2000